Marwell Zoo is a  zoo situated in Colden Common near Winchester, in the English county of Hampshire. It is owned and run by the registered charity Marwell Wildlife. The zoo is home to 1,208 animals of 149 species. The charity undertakes a range of educational and conservation activities, with a particular focus on Africa in addition to work from its base.

History
The zoo was founded by Dr John Knowles, opening in 1972. He sold a Rolls-Royce of his to buy some zebras. It was one of the earliest zoos in Europe to place an emphasis on animal conservation. Within a few years of its establishment, it became an important breeding centre for several species, some (e.g. the Mongolian wild horse) already extinct in the wild, others (e.g. the snow leopard and Siberian tiger) close to extinction.

The park is situated in the estate of Marwell Hall, a Grade I listed building originally built around the year 1320 by Walter Woodlock and largely rebuilt in 1816 by William Long. In the 1500s, the Hall belonged to the Seymour family, and there is a local legend that Henry VIII married Jane Seymour there. Between September 1941 and March 1944, Cunliffe-Owen Aircraft used the area (part of the managing director's personal estate) as an airfield to support the manufacture of military aircraft at its nearby factory in Eastleigh. After the end of World War II, the area was returned to agricultural use until the establishment of the zoo.

In 1977, a giraffe called Victor tore a muscle in his leg, collapsed on his stomach, and was unable to get up. The press suggested that he had slipped while trying to mate and compared his situation to the splits. All attempts to get him on his feet failed, and his plight became a major international news story. Portsmouth Dockyard made a hoist to attempt to raise him onto his feet. He died of a heart attack very shortly afterward in the arms of his keeper Ruth. The publicity turned Marwell into a major tourist attraction, and interest was revived the following summer, when Victor's mate, Dribbles, gave birth to a female calf named Victoria.

In 1991 Dr John Knowles was appointed an OBE for services to conservation.

In 1999, the zoo lost all of its penguins (22 African and 5 macaroni) to avian malaria. There were other cases in the UK but Marwell was the only zoo to lose its entire colony, which had arrived only two and a half years before to stock the new Penguin World exhibit. After consulting with experts, the exhibit was restocked with Humboldt penguins, which whilst endangered in the wild, are present in greater numbers in captivity.

In 2003, after constructing a new enclosure for critically endangered Amur leopards, a female leopard (Jade) escaped and fell from a tree to her death after being shot with a tranquiliser dart only days before the official opening of the exhibit. Following a replacement after the death of Jade, in 2005 the first cub born to the new Amur leopard pair, Amirah, escaped into the male's enclosure and was killed by her father. On 18 November 2007, a female Amur leopard cub (named Kiska following a public vote) was born as a result of a European Conservation Breeding Programme.

Both the park and charity changed their name to "Marwell Wildlife" in April 2009, to promote awareness of conservation work beyond the park. The charity had previously been called the Marwell Preservation Trust, and the park had been Marwell Zoological Park.

In August 2022 another female giraffe died unexpectedly.

Animal exhibits

The park includes a number of themed areas, including:

Roof of the World is themed along the Himalayan mountain range and exhibits snow leopards in a naturalistic environment.
Lemur Loop is a walkthrough exhibit that opened in 2017 and allows guests to get up close to the primates. It is home to black-and-white ruffed lemurs, crowned lemurs and ring-tailed lemurs.
Penguin Cove was refurbished in 2012 and is home to 14 Humboldt penguins

 Aridlands is home to addax, Arabian oryx, Przewalski's horses, meerkats and yellow mongooses.
 Fur, Feathers & Scales, formerly Australian Brush Walk was redeveloped in 2015 and currently includes a walk-through aviary for African birds (including hamerkop, waldrapp ibis, village weaver, Mount Omei liocichla and Madagascar teal), Cold Blooded Corner, a reptile house housing rare species' such as Gila monster and Solomon Islands skink, a partula snail unit, Egyptian tortoises and swift parrot aviaries. 2019 also saw the redevelopment of an enclosure for the red pandas.
 Life Amongst the Trees  is home to siamangs, Asian small-clawed otters, binturong, golden-headed lion tamarins, bearded emperor tamarins, coppery titis, white-faced saki, bokiboky and Visayan warty pig. Nearby live lowland anoa and pygmy hippopotamus.

Animals

The zoo's exhibits in 2011 included (in addition to those mentioned above in the Animal Exhibits section):
 219 mammals of 59 species; including tamarins, meerkats, servals, Amur tigers 
 181 birds of 37 species; including Humboldt penguins, village weavers, northern bald ibises and greater flamingoes
 More than 50 reptiles of 17 species; Kleinmann's tortoises, crocodile monitor
 More than 11 amphibians of 3 species; including Rio Cauca caecilians
 More than 26 fish of 19 species.
 More than 720 invertebrates of 14 species; including leaf-cutter ants and Partula snails

In particular, Marwell houses a large collection of ungulates, including:

Addax
Arabian oryx
Blesbok
Dorcas gazelle
Grévy's zebra
Hartmann's mountain zebra
Plains zebra
Java mouse-deer
Kirk's dik-dik
Lesser kudu
Lowland anoa
Mountain bongo
Okapi
Przewalski's horse
Pygmy hippopotamus
Roan antelope
Rothschild's giraffe
Scimitar oryx
Somali wild ass
South American tapir
Southern white rhinoceros

Conservation

The main, current Marwell Wildlife conservation programmes include Managing Biodiversity in Hampshire, assisting Grevy's zebra and its ecosystem in Kenya; supporting threatened species in Zimbabwe and managing the population of small, vulnerable populations; and reintroducing the scimitar-horned oryx to the Sahara.

The zoo has been involved in reintroducing wild horse, golden lion tamarin, roan antelope and scimitar oryx to the wild. The oryx was extinct in the wild, but more than 200 calves have been born and reared at the zoo since 1972 and many of these have been released back to the Sahara with animals from Whipsnade Zoo and Edinburgh Zoo.

The charity carries out a range of research and education activities and provides the office for the IUCN antelope specialist group.

Marwell Zoo has had notable success breeding various endangered animals including: black and white ruffed lemur (critically endangered), scimitar-horned oryx, Amur leopard (critically endangered) and snow leopard. In July 2015 a critically endangered Sulawesi-crested macaque baby was born.

October 2018 saw the birth of a Hartmann's Mountain Zebra at the zoo. First time mother, Dorotka, is genetically very important to the European population and the last successful breeding of the vulnerable species at the zoo was back in 1997.

Facilities
The family attraction additionally includes five children's playgrounds, various food kiosks, two indoor picnic lodges, and Bushtucker Bites, as well as picnic areas on Marwell Hall lawn and various other areas across the zoo. There is a hotel adjacent to the park.

The Marwell Wildlife Railway (MWR), was a  gauge railway operating around the front half of the zoo site. It was commonly known as Marwell Zoo Railway, although its locomotive is lettered MWR to reflect the former name. The line ran for a little less than a kilometre, and was served by two stations, Treetops Junction and Park End Halt. The line opened in 1987 and operated using the original rolling stock. It operated daily during school holidays, and at weekends for the rest of the spring, summer, and autumn. It is usually closed during the winter months.

Rolling stock on the railway was supplied by Severn Lamb. The only locomotive was a  steam-outline locomotive named Princess Anne. There were four passenger coaches, each capable of seating 16 adult passengers. The coaches were roofed, but open-sided. There was a 4-wheel open wagon for maintenance trains.

The Marwell Zoo Railway ceased operating in 2022.

References

External links

 Marwell Wildlife website

1972 establishments in England
Tourist attractions in Hampshire
Zoos in England
Buildings and structures in Hampshire
Zoos established in 1972
Grade I listed buildings in Hampshire